is a Japanese curler, born November 25, 1978, as . She currently skips her own team in Sapporo, Hokkaido, which represented Japan at the 2014 Winter Olympics. Also she is a curling coach.

Career
At the age of 12, Ogasawara began curling in her hometown Tokoro, joining Akiko Katoh's junior team together with Yumie Hayashi. Then Ogasawara became the second for the team. The team represented Japan at four World Junior Curling Championships (1996, 1997, 1998 & 1999), winning a silver medal in 1998 and another silver in 1999. The team later represented Japan at the 2002 Winter Olympics, finishing in 8th place with a 2-7 record.

After the 2001-2002 season, Ogasawara and her longtime teammate Hayashi moved to Aomori and formed a new team there. The team, called 'Team Aomori', represented Japan at the 2006 Winter Olympics. At the Games, Ogasawara threw last stones as skip and led her team to a 7th-place finish with a 4-5 record, including a surprise win over one of the usual curling powerhouses, Canada. After the 2005-2006 season, Ogasawara and Hayashi announced their temporary retirement. Ogasawara got married and had a child before returning to the sport in the 2011-12 season.

In 2011, Ogasawara and Hayashi, whose name had changed to Yumie Funayama after marriage, formed a new team in Sapporo. The team qualified for the 2014 Winter Olympics through the Olympic Qualification Event held in December 2013. At the Olympics, Ogasawara, a mother of one, was chosen to be Japan's flag bearer, as it is unusual for women in Japan to compete in sports after having children. At the Games, she threw last stones as skip, and the team finished in 5th place with a 4-5 record, winning against two former World Championship teams, Switzerland's Mirjam Ott and China's Wang Bingyu.

Teammates
2002 Salt Lake City Olympic Games
Akiko Katoh, Skip
Yumie Hayashi, Third
Mika Konaka, Lead
Kotomi Ishizaki, Alternate
2006 Turin Olympic Games
Yumie Hayashi, Third
Mari Motohashi, Second
Moe Meguro, Lead
Sakurako Terada, Alternate
2014 Sochi Olympic Games
Yumie Funayama, Third
Kaho Onodera, Second
Michiko Tomabechi, Lead
Chinami Yoshida, Alternate

Record as a coach of national teams

References

External links

Living people
1978 births
People from Kitami, Hokkaido
Sportspeople from Hokkaido
Japanese female curlers
Olympic curlers of Japan
Curlers at the 2002 Winter Olympics
Curlers at the 2006 Winter Olympics
Curlers at the 2014 Winter Olympics
Pacific-Asian curling champions
Japanese curling coaches
20th-century Japanese women
21st-century Japanese women